The New Zealand 45 is a sailboat that was designed by American Gary Mull and first built in 1984. The design is out of production.

Production
The boat was built by New Zealand Yachts in Whangarei, New Zealand, starting in 1984. A total of five were constructed.

Design
The New Zealand 45 is a recreational keelboat, built predominantly of fiberglass. It has a masthead sloop rig, an internally-mounted spade-type rudder and a fixed fin keel. It displaces  and carries  of ballast.

See also
List of sailing boat types

References

Keelboats
1980s sailboat type designs
Sailing yachts
Sailboat type designs by Gary Mull
Sailboat types built by New Zealand Yachts